Metropolitan Session court is a type of Sessions Court which are situated in metropolitan cities of Bangladesh. These types courts are exclusively criminal court to deal with only criminal cases. Judges appointed to such courts do not hear or try any civil matter, unlike judges of session courts in districts. 
According to the Code of Criminal Procedure (Bangladesh), a Session Judge shall be established by the Government in each of metropolitan city. Initially, two types of courts, the Courts of Sessions and the Courts of Magistrates were recognized by the code. The code was amended in 1976 with the introduction of the metropolitan police and came to effect in 1979. This amended ordinance made it essential for the government to establish the separate metropolitan session courts for metropolitan areas. Currently, there five Metropolitan courts are in function in Bangladesh.

Classification
There are two types of Metropolitan Sessions courts. Those are,
Metropolitan Sessions Judge Courts
Metropolitan Magistrate Court

Metropolitan Sessions Judge Court
Metropolitan Sessions Judge courts are presided by Sessions judges. It has been started function from 1999. Metropolitan Sessions Judge court has three tier structure consisting,
Metropolitan Sessions Judge Courts
Addition Metropolitan Sessions Judge courts
Joint Metropolitan Sessions Judge courts

Metropolitan Magistrate Court

Metropolitan Magistrate Courts are presided by Judicial Magistrates. Metropolitan Magistrate Court similarly has three tier structure consisting,
Chief Metropolitan Magistrate Court
Additional Chief Metropolitan Magistrate Courts
Metropolitan Magistrate Courts(1st Class)

List of Metropolitan Session Courts
As of 2018, there are five Metropolitan Session Courts, namely:

 Metropolitan Sessions Court, Dhaka
 Metropolitan Sessions Court, Chittagong
 Metropolitan Sessions Court, Khulna
 Metropolitan Sessions Court, Sylhet
 Metropolitan Sessions Court, Rajshahi

References

External links
 - Legal system of Bangladesh
 - Official website of Metropolitan Sessions Judge Court, Dhaka
 - Official website of Metropolitan Sessions Judge Court, Chittagong
 - Official website of Metropolitan Sessions Judge Court, Khulna
 - Official website of Metropolitan Sessions Judge Court, Sylhet
 - Official website of Metropolitan Sessions Judge Court, Rajshahi

Judiciary of Bangladesh
Law of Bangladesh
Politics of Bangladesh